Rak (also Romanized as Rāk) is a village in Rak Rural District, in the Central District of Kohgiluyeh County, Kohgiluyeh and Boyer-Ahmad Province, Iran. At the 2006 census, its population was 1,779, in 323 families.

References 

Populated places in Kohgiluyeh County